The Hands of Nara is a 1922 American silent drama film directed by Harry Garson and starring Clara Kimball Young, Elliott Dexter and  Vernon Steele. It is based on the novel of the same title by Richard Washburn Child.

Cast
 Clara Kimball Young as 	Nara Alexieff
 Count John Orloff as Boris Alexieff
 Elliott Dexter as Emlen Claveloux
 Edwin Stevens as 	Connor Lee
 Vernon Steele as Adam Pine
 John Miltern as Dr. Haith Clavelous
 Margaret Loomis as 	Emma Gammell
 Martha Mattox as Mrs. Miller
 Dulcie Cooper as 	Carrie Miller
 Edward Cooper as Gus Miller
 Myrtle Stedman as 	Vanessa Yates
 Eugenie Besserer as Mrs. Claveloux

References

Bibliography
 Connelly, Robert B. The Silents: Silent Feature Films, 1910-36, Volume 40, Issue 2. December Press, 1998.
 Munden, Kenneth White. The American Film Institute Catalog of Motion Pictures Produced in the United States, Part 1. University of California Press, 1997.

External links
 

1922 films
1922 drama films
1920s English-language films
American silent feature films
Silent American drama films
American black-and-white films
Metro Pictures films
Films directed by Harry Garson
Films based on American novels
1920s American films